The streaky clingfish (Lissonanchus lusheri) is a species of clingfish only known from one specimen collected off the coast of southern Mozambique.  The length of the only known specimen was  SL.  This species is the only known member of its genus. The single known specimen was collected at Ponte Zavora in southern Mozambique by Mrs D.N. Lusher, who sent it to J.L.B. Smith. Smith described the species from this type and named it in honour of Mrs Lusher, so the spelling should be lusherae to reflect her gender.

References

Endemic fauna of Mozambique
Gobiesocidae
Monotypic fish genera
Fish described in 1966